State Route 538 (SR 538, alternatively named College Way) is a  long state highway located within the northern area of Mount Vernon city limits and the urban growth boundary, located in Skagit County, a subdivision of the U.S. state of Washington.

Before being designated Secondary State Highway 1G (SSH 1G) in 1937, the current roadway that is now SR 538 was a county road through farmland for 26 years. US 99 was bypassed by I-5 after 1966 and became Riverside Drive. The roundabout at SR 9 was constructed in 2007 while the Riverside Drive intersection was widened in 2009.

Route description
Transitioning from a commercial to residential area, the Mount Vernon campus of the Skagit Valley College, located on the north side of the highway, is passed and eventually SR 538 leaves Mount Vernon city limits. The road turns southeast and ends at a roundabout with  within Mount Vernon's urban growth boundary.

History
Originating as a county road by 1911, SR 538 was designated Secondary State Highway 1G (SSH 1G) in 1937. I-5  was not built until after 1966 and the western terminus of SR 538 was still US 99. Between early June and late July 2007, the Washington State Department of Transportation (WSDOT) constructed a roundabout at the SR 9 and Schopf Lane intersection, the first in Skagit County.

In early 2009, between I-5 and 18th Street, WSDOT repaved the highway and expanded the Riverside Drive intersection. A city-led project to widen the section of College Way that passes under I-5 at the western terminus of SR 538 began construction in December 2018 and was completed in 2020. The street was expanded to six lanes, including dedicated left turn lanes and two through lanes that are separated from the rest of traffic by the columns of the underpass.

Major intersections

References

External links

Highways of Washington State

538
Transportation in Skagit County, Washington